The Ministry of Justice and Security (JenV) is the Dutch Ministry responsible for justice, imprisonment and public security. The Ministry was created in 1798 as the Department of Justice, before it became in 1876 the Ministry of Justice. In 2010, it took over the public safety duties from the Ministry of the Interior and Kingdom Relations and became Ministry of Security and Justice. In 2017 the Ministry was renamed to Ministry of Justice and Security. The Ministry is headed by the Minister of Justice and Security, Dilan Yeṣilgöz-Zegerius (VVD) since 10 January 2022.

Responsibilities
The Ministry has the legal tasks of:
 providing workable legislation for the public, the government and the courts;
 preventing crime, in order to build a safer society;
 protecting youth and children;
 enforcing the law, in order to build a safer society;
 providing independent, accessible and effective administration of justice and legal aid;
 providing support to the victims of crime;
 providing fair, consistent and effective enforcement of punishment and other sanctions;
 regulating immigration into the Netherlands.

It is also responsible for the coordination of counter-terrorism policy.

Because it shares so many responsibilities, and has twin buildings (both old and new) with the Ministry of the Interior and Kingdom Relations, they are sometimes called the twin ministries.

Organisation
The ministry is headed by Minister Dilan Yeşilgöz-Zegerius (VVD) and houses minister without portfolio Franc Weerwind (D66) who is responsible for policies concerning legal protection. It also knows a State secretary for migration and asylum affairs, currently Eric van der Burg (VVD), who is entitled to the title of minister abroad. It employs almost 30,000 civil servants, located at the ministry in the Hague and all around the Netherlands. The ministry's main office is located in the centre of the Hague in the same building as the Ministry of the Interior and Kingdom Relations. The civil service is headed by a secretary-general and a deputy secretary-general, who head a system of three directorates-general:
 The Directorate-General for Legislation, International Affairs and Immigration
 The Directorate-General for Prevention, Youth and Sanctions
 The Directorate-General for the Administration of Justice and Law Enforcement

The Board of Procurators General (in Dutch: Raad van Procureurs-Generaal) which heads the Public Prosecution Service (in Dutch: Openbaar Ministerie, OM) is a relatively independent organisation which forms part of the Judiciary and prosecutes persons suspected of breaking the law.

The Netherlands Forensic Institute is an autonomous division of the Ministry of Justice, falling under the Directorate-General for the Administration of Justice and  Law Enforcement. The Custodial Institutions Agency is an agency of the ministry.

See also
List of Ministers of Justice of the Netherlands

References

External links
 

Justice and Security
Netherlands
Netherlands
Netherlands
Netherlands
Ministries established in 1798
1798 establishments in the Batavian Republic
Skyscrapers in The Hague
18th-century architecture in the Netherlands